Ledston is a civil parish in the metropolitan borough of the City of Leeds, West Yorkshire, England.  It contains 20 listed buildings that are recorded in the National Heritage List for England. Of these, four are listed at Grade I, the highest of the three grades, two are at Grade II*, the middle grade, and the others are at Grade II, the lowest grade.  The parish contains the village of Ledston and the surrounding countryside.  The most important building in the parish is Ledston Hall, which is listed, together with a number of associated structures.  The other listed buildings are a farmhouse, farm buildings, two mileposts, and two former winding houses at a colliery that has closed.


Key

Buildings

References

Citations

Sources

 

Lists of listed buildings in West Yorkshire